Judge Sharp may refer to:

Allen Sharp (1932–2009), judge of the United States District Court for the Northern District of Indiana
G. Kendall Sharp (1934–2022), judge of the United States District Court for the Middle District of Florida
Kevin H. Sharp (born 1963), judge of the United States District Court for the Middle District of Tennessee
Morell Edward Sharp (1920–1980), judge of the United States District Court for the Western District of Washington
Gary L. Sharpe (born 1947), judge of the United States District Court for the Northern District of New York
George H. Sharpe (1828–1900), member of the Board of General Appraisers, predecessor of the United States Court of International Trade

See also
Justice Sharp (disambiguation)